During the 1998–99 English football season, Barnsley F.C. competed in the Football League First Division.

Season summary
In the summer, Danny Wilson departed Barnsley to join Sheffield Wednesday, and with the team looking to bounce back to the Premier League John Hendrie was named manager.

The Red's promotion hopes were hampered when they lost influential captain Neil Redfearn who was sold to Charlton Athletic after making 338 first team appearances for Barnsley.

The season was mostly unremarkable in terms of results and on 19 April 1999, Hendrie was sacked with the club nowhere near the top six and Hendrie's assistant Eric Winstanley took caretaker charge for the remaining games of the season. Barnsley then went on to finish a disappointing campaign in 13th place. One of the highlights of the season was a 7–1 home victory against local rivals Huddersfield Town. This was the only time new signing Craig Hignett and Ashley Ward played together, with Ward leaving for Blackburn. After the season Barnsley lost yet more players from the promotion season, with solid defender Arjan de Zeeuw and attacking midfield player Clint Marcelle both leaving the club. Goalkeeper David Watson also suffered an injury mid-season that later ended his career.

Final league table

Results
Barnsley's score comes first

Legend

Football League First Division

FA Cup

League Cup

Squad

Left club during the season

References

Barnsley F.C. seasons
Barnsley